The Ravine Flyer II is a hybrid wooden roller coaster located at Waldameer Park in Erie, Pennsylvania, United States. It was ranked as the best new ride of 2008 by Amusement Today magazine. The Ravine Flyer II was built at the site of the park's old Ravine Flyer, which was removed in 1938 after a man died. Initial concepts for the replacement ride were developed by Custom Coasters International in the early 1990s, further developed by Dennis McNulty several years later, then finalized and constructed by The Gravity Group with Jeff Mason overseeing construction. 

The roller coaster traverses Pennsylvania Route 832 along its course, emulating the course of the Ravine Flyer.

History 
Steve Gorman, general manager of Waldameer & Water World in Erie, Pennsylvania, announced in 1997 that his company would build a wooden roller coaster. The ride would be named Ravine Flyer II, after an early 20th-century coaster at Waldameer that operated from 1922 to 1938. At the time of its announcement, Ravine Flyer II was planned to be completed in 2000. At $3.5 million, it would be the most expensive ride in Waldameer's history. The ride would cross over Pennsylvania Route 832, the main entrance to the nearby Presque Isle State Park. Waldameer had previously obtained a  easement allowing the park to build a roller coaster above PA 832. By September 1998, Custom Coasters International (CCI) had been hired to design the ride, which had been pushed back to 2001.

By mid-2001, the ride's construction had been delayed due to lawsuits. Brian and Antoinette Candela, who lived near the proposed coaster, claimed that the ride violated a Pennsylvania state law because it was within a "bluff recession hazard area". Additionally, the Pennsylvania government planned to build a greenway and visitor center near the ride. Brian Candela subsequently accused Waldameer owner Paul Nelson of bragging about his political connections, which Nelson had claimed would permit the ride's construction. Local officials granted a zoning variance to Waldameer in April 2004, allowing the park to build the ride above PA 832. By then, the ride's cost had increased to $6 million. The roller coaster's opponents relented after a court ruled in Waldameer's favor in January 2006.

Meanwhile, the Gravity Group was hired to construct the ride following CCI's bankruptcy in 2002. The ride opened on May 19, 2008. Waldameer held an auction to select the first 24 riders.

Characteristics
The ride is a hybrid coaster with wooden track and a steel frame. It was manufactured by the Gravity Group.

The trains were created by Philadelphia Toboggan Coasters. The passengers are secured by a seatbelt and a lap bar. There are two six-car trains (some of which are painted red, and some of which are painted blue), both of which can carry up to 24 passengers.

Ride experience
After leaving the station, the trains immediately travel over the transfer track, making a short drop and left hand turn to the lift hill. After climbing the lift hill, the train immediately descends the first drop, turning sharply to the right, and travels an airtime hill, crossing Peninsula Drive. The track curves to the right, then left, while ascending into the far turn around, curving to the right and ascending to the top of the second major drop. The trains descend into the second crossing of Peninsula Drive over an air time hill. This is immediately followed by a pair of tunnels enclosing small air time hills, and an ascending turn to the left. The track makes a slight descending left hand turn before entering the 90° banked right turn, then travels underneath the lift hill. The track continues turning to the right, traveling a bunny hop hill and making a final right hand turn before entering the brake run and returning to the station.

Awards
Ravine Flyer II won best new ride at the 2008 Golden Ticket Awards and was voted the 11th best wooden roller coaster at the same awards.

References

Roller coasters in Pennsylvania
Buildings and structures in Erie, Pennsylvania
Roller coasters introduced in 2008
Best New Ride winners